Karl Michael von Attems (Gorizia, 1 July 1711 – Gorizia, 18 February 1774) was an Austrian Catholic archbishop and a prince of the Holy Roman Empire.

Biography
Belonging to the noble family of the Counts of Attems, Karl Michael was born in Gorizia on 1 July 1711. He received an expansive cultural and scholarly education and benefited from the support of Maria Theresa of Austria. He was a canon in the Cathedral of Basilea, an apostolic vicariate for the area of the empire belonging to the Patriarchate of Aquileia. On August 25, 1750, he was nominated Bishop of Pergamo. He was later promoted to "first archbishop" of the new Roman Catholic Archdiocese of Gorizia on April 24, 1752. In 1766 he was nominated prince of the Holy Roman Empire.

He was tasked by the noble families of the area to reorganized the church of Gorizia after the suppression of the Patriarchate of Aquileia. In 1753, he instituted the Mount of Piety to counter usury, and in 1756 he opened the hospital "di San Raffaele" culminating in 1757 with the foundation of a seminary.

Images

References

This article contains text translated from the Italian.

1711 births
1774 deaths
18th-century Roman Catholic archbishops in the Holy Roman Empire
Austrian theologians
Roman Catholic archbishops of Gorizia